Antonio Hernández (born 1 April 1955) is a Mexican former footballer. He competed in the men's tournament at the 1976 Summer Olympics.

References

External links
 

1955 births
Living people
Mexican footballers
Mexico international footballers
Olympic footballers of Mexico
Footballers at the 1976 Summer Olympics
Place of birth missing (living people)
Association football defenders